A geosynchronous transfer orbit or geostationary transfer orbit (GTO) is a type of geocentric orbit. Satellites that are destined for geosynchronous (GSO) or geostationary orbit (GEO) are (almost) always put into a GTO as an intermediate step for reaching their final orbit.

A GTO is highly elliptic. Its perigee (closest point to Earth) is typically as high as low Earth orbit (LEO), while its apogee (furthest point from Earth) is as high as geostationary (or equally, a geosynchronous) orbit. That makes it a Hohmann transfer orbit between LEO and GSO.

While some GEO satellites are launched direct to that orbit, often the launch vehicle lacks the power to put both the rocket and the satellite into that orbit. Instead extra fuel is added to the satellite, the launch vehicle launches to a geostationary transfer orbit then the satellite circularises its orbit at geostationary altitude. This benefits from staging, the launch vehicles and the mass of its structure and engines do not need to be lifted up to a circular geostationary altitude.

Manufacturers of launch vehicles often advertise the amount of payload the vehicle can put into GTO.

Technical description

The period of a standard geosynchronous transfer orbit is about 10.5 hours. The argument of perigee is such that apogee occurs on or near the equator. Perigee can be anywhere above the atmosphere, but is usually restricted to a few hundred kilometers above the Earth's surface to reduce launcher delta-V requirements and to limit the orbital lifetime of the spent booster so as to curtail space junk. If using low-thrust engines such as electrical propulsion to get from the transfer orbit to geostationary orbit, the transfer orbit can be supersynchronous (having an apogee above the final geosynchronous orbit). However, this method takes much longer to achieve due to the low thrust injected into the orbit. The typical launch vehicle injects the satellite to a supersynchronous orbit having the apogee above 42,164 km. The satellite's low-thrust engines are thrusted continuously around the geostationary transfer orbits. The thrust direction and magnitude are usually determined to optimize the transfer time and/or duration while satisfying the mission constraints. The out-of-plane component of thrust is used to reduce the initial inclination set by the initial transfer orbit, while the in-plane component simultaneously raises the perigee and lowers the apogee of the intermediate geostationary transfer orbit. In case of using the Hohmann transfer orbit, only a few days are required to reach the geosynchronous orbit. By using low-thrust engines or electrical propulsion, months are required until the satellite reaches its final orbit.

The orbital inclination of a GTO is the angle between the orbit plane and the Earth's equatorial plane. It is determined by the latitude of the launch site and the launch azimuth (direction). The inclination and eccentricity must both be reduced to zero to obtain a geostationary orbit. If only the eccentricity of the orbit is reduced to zero, the result may be a geosynchronous orbit but will not be geostationary. Because the  required for a plane change is proportional to the instantaneous velocity, the inclination and eccentricity are usually changed together in a single maneuver at apogee, where velocity is lowest.

The required  for an inclination change at either the ascending or descending node of the orbit is calculated as follows:

For a typical GTO with a semi-major axis of 24,582 km, perigee velocity is 9.88 km/s and apogee velocity is 1.64 km/s, clearly making the inclination change far less costly at apogee. In practice, the inclination change is combined with the orbital circularization (or "apogee kick") burn to reduce the total  for the two maneuvers. The combined  is the vector sum of the inclination change  and the circularization , and as the sum of the lengths of two sides of a triangle will always exceed the remaining side's length, total  in a combined maneuver will always be less than in two maneuvers. The combined  can be calculated as follows:

Other considerations

Even at apogee, the fuel needed to reduce inclination to zero can be significant, giving equatorial launch sites a substantial advantage over those at higher latitudes. Russia's Baikonur Cosmodrome in Kazakhstan is at 46° north latitude. Kennedy Space Center in the United States is at 28.5° north. China's Wenchang is at 19.5° north. Guiana Space Centre, the European Ariane and European-operated Russian Soyuz launch facility, is at 5° north. The "indefinitely suspended" Sea Launch launched from a floating platform directly on the equator in the Pacific Ocean.

Expendable launchers generally reach GTO directly, but a spacecraft already in a low Earth orbit (LEO) can enter GTO by firing a rocket along its orbital direction to increase its velocity. This was done when geostationary spacecraft were launched from the space Shuttle; a "perigee kick motor" attached to the spacecraft ignited after the shuttle had released it and withdrawn to a safe distance.

Although some launchers can take their payloads all the way to geostationary orbit, most end their missions by releasing their payloads into GTO. The spacecraft and its operator are then responsible for the maneuver into the final geostationary orbit.  The 5-hour coast to first apogee can be longer than the battery lifetime of the launcher or spacecraft, and the maneuver is sometimes performed at a later apogee or split among multiple apogees. The solar power available on the spacecraft supports the mission after launcher separation. Also, many launchers now carry several satellites in each launch to reduce overall costs, and this practice simplifies the mission when the payloads may be destined for different orbital positions.

Because of this practice, launcher capacity is usually quoted as spacecraft mass to GTO, and this number will be higher than the payload that could be delivered directly into GEO.

For example, the capacity (adapter and spacecraft mass) of the Delta IV Heavy is 14,200 kg to GTO, or 6,750 kg directly to geostationary orbit.

If the maneuver from GTO to GEO is to be performed with a single impulse, as with a single solid-rocket motor, apogee must occur at an equatorial crossing and at synchronous orbit altitude. This implies an argument of perigee of either 0° or 180°. Because the argument of perigee is slowly perturbed by the oblateness of the Earth, it is usually biased at launch so that it reaches the desired value at the appropriate time (for example, this is usually the sixth apogee on Ariane 5 launches). If the GTO inclination is zero, as with Sea Launch, then this does not apply. (It also would not apply to an impractical GTO inclined at 63.4°; see Molniya orbit.)

The preceding discussion has primarily focused on the case where the transfer between LEO and GEO is done with a single intermediate transfer orbit.  More complicated trajectories are sometimes used. For example, the Proton-M uses a set of three intermediate orbits, requiring five upper-stage rocket firings, to place a satellite into GEO from the high-inclination site of Baikonur Cosmodrome, in Kazakhstan.  Because of Baikonur's high latitude and range safety considerations that block launches directly east, it requires less delta-v to transfer satellites to GEO by using a supersynchronous transfer orbit where the apogee (and the maneuver to reduce the transfer orbit inclination) are at a higher altitude than 35,786 km, the geosynchronous altitude.  Proton even offers to perform a supersynchronous apogee maneuver up to 15 hours after launch.

See also

 Astrodynamics
 Low Earth orbit
 List of orbits
 Aeronautics

References 

Astrodynamics
Earth orbits